Prairie Township is an inactive township in Franklin County, in the U.S. state of Missouri.

Prairie Township was established in 1853, taking its name from the prairie land within its borders.

References

Townships in Missouri
Townships in Franklin County, Missouri